Leslie Surman (23 November 1947 – 5 December 1978) was an English professional footballer who played in the Football League for Charlton Athletic and Rotherham United. On his Charlton debut in 1965, Surman conceded three goals, and never played for the club again. Surman later played non-league football for Cambridge United, and died in 1978, aged 31.

References

1947 births
1978 deaths
English footballers
Charlton Athletic F.C. players
Rotherham United F.C. players
Cambridge United F.C. players
English Football League players
Association football goalkeepers